Bruno Germain, (born 28 April 1960) is a former footballer who played as a defensive midfielder. In his playing career he played for seven French clubs, most notably Olympique Marseille and Paris Saint-Germain, being capped once for France. Germain is the father of former Monaco, Nice, Marseille, and now Montpellier player Valère Germain.

Honours
Olympique Marseille
 Ligue 1: 1989, 1990, 1991
 UEFA Champions League runner-up: 1991
 Ligue 2: 1995
 Coupe de France: 1989

Paris Saint-Germain
 Coupe de France: 1993

References

External links
 Profile

Living people
1960 births
Footballers from Orléans
Association football midfielders
French footballers
France international footballers
AS Nancy Lorraine players
Racing Club de France Football players
SC Toulon players
Olympique de Marseille players
Paris Saint-Germain F.C. players
Angers SCO players